Patricia Demick (born January 26, 1972 in Viña del Mar, Chile) is a female boxer.

Biography

Career 
While she is better known as a boxer, she has also posed as a model for various magazines, often wearing sports bikinis and boxing gloves. This has, in turn, made her kind of an unlikely sex symbol to her fans in Chile, and to women's boxing fans in the United States.

Patricia Demick became an American citizen after marrying her American trainer.

Demick's professional boxing career began on March 26, 1999, when she knocked out experienced Karen Rios in the first round, at Hialeah, Florida. She won her next two fights, also by knockout.

After winning her first three fights by knockout, Demick and her managing team felt it was time to step up in her opposition's quality level, so Demick fought Puerto Rican Daisy Ocasio and former world champion Marsha Valley, losing back to back six round unanimous decisions to them.

After three more wins, she received her first world title try: On June 16, 2001, she fought Valérie Hénin  in Anchorage, Alaska, for the WIBF world Welterweight title. The fight was declared a draw (tie) after ten rounds, but the scoring was controversial; many fans that saw the fight thought Demick deserved the decision.

Her next fight would prove to be even more controversial. She challenged Karla Redo for the WIBA's world Welterweight title, in Ft. Lauderdale, Florida. Demick became world champion by accident, as she was declared the fight's winner after eight rounds.

Demick made history for Chilean boxing that night, but her joy only lasted a few hours, because it was discovered that the judges had added their scorecards wrongly, therefore, Demick ultimately ended up losing the fight by an eight round decision.

Acknowledgments 
Demick went on to win two of the next three fights she had since that fight took place.

She currently holds a record of 8 wins, 4 losses, and one draw, with 5 knockout wins. She has not had a boxing contest since 2003.

References

1972 births
Living people
Chilean emigrants to the United States
Chilean women boxers
People from Viña del Mar
Welterweight boxers